PFC Energy is a global energy research and consultancy group.

About 
Its services include upstream and gas, midstream and downstream oil, markets and country strategies, and financial sector consulting, as well as scenario planning and country economic modeling. The company also provides consulting services related to clean energy, alternative fuels, and natural gas. Its clients are oil and gas operators, national oil companies, service companies, investors, governments and other stakeholders. PFC Energy has focused exclusively on the energy sector for since 1984, covering all phases of the energy value chain, and the assets and activities of key countries and companies. An independent partnership with more than 130 professional staff, PFC Energy is based in Washington, D.C. and also maintains offices in Houston, Kuala Lumpur, Moscow, Paris, Beijing and Singapore.

The company was originally known as Petroleum Finance Company. On January 27, 2007, it changed its name to PFC Energy.

On June 8, 2011, PFC Energy and Guggenheim Securities formed a strategic alliance to provide research and analytical services to institutional investors and to collaborate on investment banking activities for corporate clients interested in the energy sector. On June 20, 2013, IHS Inc. acquired PFC Energy.

PFC Energy 50

Every January, PFC Energy publishes the "PFC Energy 50", the definitive ranking of the World's Largest Listed Energy Firms. PFC Energy 50 ranks the world's leading publicly traded energy companies by market capitalization. The listing includes companies from nine sectors: International Oil Companies; National Oil Companies; Exploration & Production; Midstream/Infrastructure, Refining & Marketing; Gas/Utilities; Oilfield & Drilling Services; Equipment, Engineering & Construction; and Alternative Energy.

Leadership

• Robin West, Chairman

References

External links
 

1984 establishments in Washington, D.C.
Research and analysis firms
Petroleum industry
Companies based in Washington, D.C.
American companies established in 1984
Consulting firms established in 1984
Research and analysis firms of the United States
2013 mergers and acquisitions
American corporate subsidiaries
1984 establishments in the United States
Companies established in 1984